Butyl nitrite is the organic compound with the formula CH3(CH2)3ONO.  It is an alkyl nitrite made from n-butanol. Butyl nitrite is used recreationally as poppers. Synonyms include 1-butyl nitrite, n-butyl nitrite and nitrous acid butyl ester.

It can be prepared by treating nitrous acid (generated in situ with n-butanol.

Applications
Butyl nitrite is one of the compounds used as poppers, inhalant drugs that induce brief euphoria. It was developed by Clifford Hassing, a graduate student in Los Angeles, as a faster-acting analog of alkyl nitrite. Among the inhalants' trade names are Rush, Locker Room, and Bolt. They are sometimes marketed as "Cleaner", liquid incense, or room odorizer. It is used for its euphoric effect and for relaxing the smooth muscles during sexual intercourse.

See also
tert-butyl nitrite

References

Antianginals
Antidotes
Alkyl nitrites
Butyl compounds